The ERA Mini Turbo is a modified Mini city car that was produced by Engineering Research & Application Ltd. under the ERA brand name from 1989 to 1991 at Dunstable in Bedfordshire, England. The fastest-ever version of the original Mini to be sold through official dealers, it has been described as "the spiritual successor to the Cooper and the 1275 GT".

The body kit was styled by Dennis Adams, who also designed the Marcos sports cars and the Probe 16 (the car used in 'A Clockwork Orange').

The car, which uses mostly Austin Rover components, was marketed through Austin Rover dealers.

The interior has specially narrowed MG Metro front seats trimmed in Connolly Leather hide or a mix of grey tweed and leather, VDO  instruments in an ERA-designed dash panel, pile carpeting, and a sunroof.

Torque steer, common in a front-wheel drive layout, is mitigated by greater front-wheel toe-out and specially-made lower front suspension arms that provide 1.5 degrees of negative camber.  The 6" x 13" aluminium alloy wheels are intended for either Goodyear or Dunlop 165/60HR13 low-profile tyres.

The servo-assisted braking system has Metro ventilated discs and four-pot calipers at the front, with modified drums at the rear. The car has adjustable shock absorbers all round, and the ride height is lowered.

A total of 436 ERA Mini Turbos were produced.

References

External links
ERA Mini Turbo web site

Cars of England
Mini vehicles
Cars introduced in 1989
1990s cars
Cars discontinued in 1991